Ben Davis is a cellist from the United Kingdom known for his improvisation. His group Basquiat Strings was nominated for the Mercury Prize in 2007. He is a member of the F-IRE Collective.

His group, Basquiat Strings, originated as a standard string quartet (two violins, a viola and a cello). Only later did cellist Davis decide to add double bass and drums "to strengthen the rhythmic accompaniment". Basquiat Strings were nominated for the 2007 Mercury Prize. The band performed an Electric Prom in 2008 featuring NY sax player Elery Eskerlin.

Ben Davis studied at the Guildhall School of Music and Drama and later at the Banff School of Fine Arts with Dave Holland.

He has since pursued a varied musical career encompassing classical, world, early music, jazz and experimental. He has performed with Ingrid Laubrock, Bobby McFerrin, Mary Halvorson, Simon Nabatov, Wadada Leo Smith, Tom Rainey, Tomeka Reid, Vincent Courtois, Django Bates, Chris Biscoe, Liam Noble, Stuart Hall, Hassan Erraji, Mulatu Astatke, Joglaresa, The Dufay Collective, Evan Parker, Christine Tobin, Steve Buckley, Huw Warren, Jason Yarde, Julian Joseph, and the Stavanger Symphony Orchestra. Ben moved to the Chicago USA in 2016 where he formed a trio with guitarist Sam Mosching and drummer Steve Hunt and a duo with guitarist Matt Gold.

Influences
Alongside the jazz and the classical influences, there are also folk elements including Macedonian tapan rhythms and Hungarian processional marches.

Discography

Albums as a leader
 The Ben Davis Group (with Paul Clarvis and Chris Biscoe)
 Basquiat Strings (with Seb Rochford) - Basquiat Strings
 Basquiat Strings - Part Two
 Courtship - Ben Davis Solo Cello

Albums as a sideman
 Forensic - Ingrid Laubrock
 Oriole - Song for the Sleeping
 Oriole  - Migration
 Oriole - Every New Day 
 Julia Biel - Not Alone 
 Orbestra - Transdanubian Swineherds
 Joglaresa - Magdalena 
 Clown Revisited - Flashes of a Normal World'' 
 Butterfly Wing - Le Depart
 Fumi Okiji's Old Time Jazz Band - Old Fashion 
 Alex Hutton Trio - songs From the Seven Hills
 Yurodny - Evenset
 Laura Jurd - Landing Ground
 Ingrid Laubrock Octet - Zurich Concert
 Zac Gvirtzman - Monk Spent Youth 
 Simon Nabatov - String Trio
 Huw Warren - A Barrel Organ Far From Home
 Polar Bear - Polar Bear

References

External links
 Ben Davis site
 Ben Davis' bio at Trinity College of Music

British cellists
Living people
Year of birth missing (living people)
FMR Records artists